The Holmenkollen Ski Festival ( or ) is a traditional annual Nordic skiing event in Holmenkollen, Oslo, Norway. The full official name of the event is Holmenkollen FIS World Cup Nordic.

History
It takes place in March and has been arranged every year since 1892, except for 1898 and during World War II (1941–1945). The event is arranged by Skiforeningen and takes place at Holmenkollen National Arena and ski jumping hills Holmenkollbakken and Midtstubakken. In 2009 Holmenkollen was under renovation and replacement races were held in Trondheim for cross-country skiing and biathlon, and in Vikersund for ski jumping and nordic combined.

In 2011, Holmenkollen hosted the FIS Nordic World Ski Championships and there was no separate Holmenkollen Ski Festival. Previously Holmekollen had hosted World Championships in 1930, 1966, 1982, and it also hosted the Nordic skiing events of 1952 Winter Olympics that were also that year's World Championships. Holmenkollen has also hosted biathlon World Championship events in 1986, 1990, 1999, 2000, and 2002, and hosted it once again in 2016.

See also
 Holmenkollen 50 km
 List of multiple winners at the Holmenkollen ski festival
 Winter festival

References

External links

 
FIS Cross-Country World Cup
Nordic skiing competitions in Norway
Ski jumping competitions in Norway
International sports competitions in Oslo
Holmenkollen
Recurring sporting events established in 1892
1892 establishments in Norway
March sporting events